The 2011 Halton Borough Council election took place on 10 May 2011 to elect members of Halton Unitary Council in Cheshire, England. One third of the council was up for election and the Labour party stayed in overall control of the council.

After the election, the composition of the council was

 Labour 44
 Liberal Democrat 6
 Conservative 3
 Independent 3

Ward results

References

2011 English local elections
2011
2010s in Cheshire